Hy-Gain (often written "hy-gain") is a manufacturer of antenna and antenna related products for the amateur radio industry.  Its best-known products are a line of Yagi antennas and antenna rotators.  Hy-Gain used to be owned by Telex Communications, which sold it to MFJ Enterprises in 1999.

References

External links 
 MFJ Enterprises Web Site

Amateur radio companies
Technology companies established in 1949
1949 establishments in Nebraska
Companies based in Mississippi